RC-18 or Villianur-Bahour Road starts from Villianur and ends at Bahour Junction.

It passes through the following villages:
 Karikalampakkam
 Seliyamedu

References

External links
 Official website of Public Works Department, Puducherry UT

State highways in Puducherry
Transport in Puducherry